A Map of the Heart is a 2002 German drama film directed by Dominik Graf.

Cast 
 Karoline Eichhorn - Katrin Engelhardt
 Antonio Wannek - Malte Gosrau
 Sebastian Urzendowsky - Kai Gosrau
  - Jürgen Benthagen
 Peter Lohmeyer - Robert
  - Foster mother
 Ulrich Gebauer - Foster father

References

External links 

2002 drama films
2002 films
German drama films
2000s German films
Films directed by Dominik Graf